Tim Hopper is an American actor known for his appearances in  movies like Tenderness and To Die For.

He has been an ensemble member of the Steppenwolf Theater Company in Chicago, Illinois since 1988 and acted in various stage productions, including Arthur Miller's The Crucible.

He was nominated for the 2003 Joseph Jefferson Award in the category "Actor in a Supporting Role in a Play" for "The Violet Hour" and received an Obie Award for his performance in "More Stately Mansions" at the New York Theatre Workshop.

In 2012, Hopper appeared as Henry in the off-Broadway production of Him with Primary Stages.

Filmography

Film

Television

Videogames

References

External links
 

American male television actors
Living people
Place of birth missing (living people)
Year of birth missing (living people)
Steppenwolf Theatre Company players